Hédi Majdoub (born 1 December 1969) is a Tunisian politician. He served as Minister of the Interior in the cabinet of Prime Minister Youssef Chahed.

References 

Living people
1969 births
Place of birth missing (living people)
21st-century Tunisian politicians
Interior ministers of Tunisia